The 1983 Japan Open Tennis Championships was a combined men's and women's tennis tournament played on outdoor hard courts in Tokyo, Japan that was part of the 1983 Virginia Slims World Championship Series and the 1983 Volvo Grand Prix. The tournament was held from 17 October through 23 October 1983. Eliot Teltscher and Etsuko Inoue won the singles titles.

Finals

Men's singles

 Eliot Teltscher defeated  Andrés Gómez 7–5, 3–6, 6–1
It was Teltscher's 1st title of the year and the 11th of his career.

Women's singles
 Etsuko Inoue defeated  Shelley Solomon 6–2, 5–7, 6–1
 It was Inoue's 1st career title.

Men's doubles
 Sammy Giammalva Jr. /  Steve Meister defeated  Tim Gullikson /  Tom Gullikson 6–4, 6–7, 7–6

Women's doubles
 Chris O'Neil /  Pam Whytcross defeated  Helena Manset /  Micki Schillig 6–3, 7–5
 It was O'Neil's 1st title of the year and the 2nd of her career. It was Whytcross' 3rd title of the year and of her career.

References

External links
 Official website
  Association of Tennis Professionals (ATP) tournament profile

 
Japan Open (tennis)
Japan Open Tennis Championships
Japan Open Tennis Championships
Japan Open Tennis Championships
Japan Open Tennis Championships